Essential is a compilation of American guitarist Leo Kottke's releases on the Chrysalis label, released in 1991. It includes liner notes by Fred Goodman.

A number of compilations have been made of Kottke's music by his various record labels. Capitol had previously released 1971-1976 and The Best. The Rhino box set release Anthology covers the first 15 years of Kottke's career and includes selections from the Takoma, Capitol, and Chrysalis releases along with extensive liner notes. Capitol later released another compilation package titled The Best of Leo Kottke.

Track listing
All songs by Leo Kottke except as noted.
All tracks are excerpted from Leo Kottke, Burnt Lips, Balance, Guitar Music, and Time Step.
The version of "Airproofing" represented here is the original, not the later extended version.

 "Up Tempo" – 1:40
 "Embryonic Journey" (Jorma Kaukonen) – 3:17
 "Rings" (Eddie Reeves. Alex Harvey) – 2:55
 "Mr. Fonebone" – 2:05
 "Julie's House" – 3:27
 "Side One Suite:"
 "Some Birds" – 0:59
 "Sounds Like..." – 1:28
 "Slang" – 2:42
 "My Double" – 2:05
 "Three Walls and Bars" – 2:13
 "Reprise: Some Birds" – :59
 "Sonora's Death Row" (Kevin Blackie Farrell) – 4:30
 "Learning the Game" (Buddy Holly) – 4:07
 "The White Ape" – 2:10
 "Buckaroo" (Bob Morris) – 2:03
 "Tell Mary" – 3:04
 "Airproofing" – 2:15
 "Part Two" – 1:44
 "Agile N." – 1:45
 "Tumbling Tumbleweeds" (Bob Nolan) – 2:42
 "Sleep Walk" (Johnny Farina, Santo Farina, Ann Farina) – 2:23
 "The Credits: Out-takes from Terry's Movie" – 3:46
 "Little Shoes" – 1:32
 "The Train and the Gate: From Terry's Movie" – 3:18
 "All I Have To Do Is Dream" (Boudleaux Bryant) – 1:42
 "Frank Forgets" – 2:09
 "Here Comes That Rainbow Again" (Kris Kristofferson) – 3:50

Personnel
Leo Kottke - 6 & 12-string guitar, vocals
David Kemper - drums
David Miner - bass
Emmylou Harris - background vocals
Kenny Buttrey - drums
Mike Leech - bass
Bobby Ogdin - piano
John Harris - piano

References

External links
Leo Kottke's official site
Unofficial Leo Kottke web site (fan site)

1991 greatest hits albums
Leo Kottke compilation albums
Albums produced by Denny Bruce
Albums produced by T Bone Burnett
Chrysalis Records compilation albums